Žeželj Bridge is a tied-arch bridge on Danube river in Novi Sad, Vojvodina, Serbia. The bridge was originally built in 1961, only to be destroyed during the 1999 NATO bombing of Yugoslavia. The newly constructed bridge was opened in 2018.

History
The original Žeželj Bridge (377 meters long) was a through arch bridge built between 1957 and 1961. It was designed by the prominent Yugoslavian civil engineer Branko Žeželj and constructed by Mostogradnja. It connected the city area of Novi Sad and Petrovaradin. During its existence, it served as part of an international railway line and as a transit road through Novi Sad.

During the NATO bombing of Yugoslavia, the bridge was bombed 12 times. On 23 April 1999, it was finally destroyed, cutting railway transport between Belgrade and Subotica, i.e. Serbia and Hungary. During the NATO bombing, all three large bridges on Danube river in Novi Sad (Žeželj Bridge, Varadin Bridge and Liberty Bridge) were completely destroyed.

In 2000, a temporary Road–Railway Bridge was constructed near the Žeželj Bridge to serve as a replacement of Žeželj Bridge until the new one was constructed. Over the years, the construction of the new Žeželj Bridge was postponed several times.

In April 2012, the construction works for the new bridge in the same place officially started. The main designer of the new bridge was Aleksandar Bojović, while the contractor was an international consortium, JV Azvi - Taddei – Horta Coslada. The new bridge is visually similar to the destroyed bridge, except that the arches are made from steel and not prestressed concrete.

In October 2017, the arches of Žeželj Bridge were connected after five years of construction and eighteen years after the previous bridge was destroyed. As of October 2017, the construction works cost was 51.71 million euros. In April 2018, the bridge was completed and regular rail transport established. The vehicle transit was established on 1 September 2018.

See also
 List of bridges in Serbia
 List of crossings of the Danube
 List of road–rail bridges

References

External links

 Žeželj Bridge at structurae.net

Bridges in Novi Sad
Buildings and structures in Novi Sad
Bridges completed in 2018
Bridges over the Danube
2018 establishments in Serbia
Rebuilt buildings and structures in Serbia
Buildings and structures in Vojvodina
Bridges in Serbia